Jacopone da Todi, O.F.M. (ca. 1230 – 25 December 1306) was an Italian Franciscan friar from Umbria. He wrote several laude (songs in praise of the Lord) in the local vernacular. He was an early pioneer in Italian theatre, being one of the earliest scholars who dramatised Gospel subjects.

Life
Born Jacopo dei Benedetti, he was a member of a noble family. He studied law in Bologna and became a successful lawyer. At some point in his late 20s, he married a young noblewoman, named Vanna according to some accounts, who was a pious and generous woman. Due to his reputation as a worldly and greedy man, she took it upon herself to mortify her flesh in atonement for his behavior.

Not long after their wedding, Benedetti urged his wife to attend a public tournament. In the course of the spectacle, she was killed when part of the stand in which she was sitting gave way. Rushing to her side, he discovered that she had been wearing a hairshirt. Shocked, he realized that she had performed this penance for his sake.

Benedetti gave up his legal practice, gave away all his possessions and from about 1268 lived as a wandering ascetic, joining the Third Order of St. Francis. During this period, he gained a reputation as a madman, due to his eccentric behavior, acting out his spiritual vision, earning him the nickname he was to embrace of Jacopone. Examples of this behavior included appearing in the public square of Todi, wearing a saddle and crawling on all fours. On another occasion, he appeared at a wedding in his brother's house, tarred and feathered from head to toe.

After about ten years of this life, Benedetti sought admission to the Friars Minor, but they were reluctant to accept him due to his reputation. He soon composed a beautiful poem on the vanities of the world, which led to his admission into the Order in 1278. He chose to live as a lay brother.

By this time, two broad factions had arisen in the Franciscan Order, one with a more lenient, less mystical attitude and one being more severe, preaching absolute poverty and penitence (known as the "Spirituals" or Fraticelli). Jacopone was connected with the latter group and in 1294 they sent a deputation to Pope Celestine V to ask permission to live separately from the other friars and to observe the Franciscan Rule in its perfection. The request was granted but Celestine resigned the papacy before action was taken and was succeeded by Pope Boniface VIII, who opposed the more rigorous views. During the struggle that followed, Benedetti publicized the Spirituals' cause by writing verses highly critical of their opponents, the pope included. When two brother-cardinals, the Colonnas, sided with the Spirituals and with the king of France against Pope Boniface, and Benedetti gave his support to the Colonnas, politics and even war entered upon the scene. The pope excommunicated them. A battle between the two rival parties ensued, ending with the siege of Palestrina and the imprisonment and excommunication of Jacopone in 1298. He was freed in 1303 upon the death of Boniface, having been specifically excluded from the Jubilee Year of 1300 by papal bull.

Broken and in poor health, Benedetti retired to Collazzone, a small town situated on a hill between Perugia and Todi, where he was cared for by a community of Poor Clares. His condition deteriorated toward the end of 1306, and he sent word requesting that his old friend, John of La Verna, come to give him the last rites. John arrived on Christmas Eve and comforted him, as he died about midnight.

Benedetti's body was originally buried in the monastery church. In 1433 his grave was discovered and his remains transferred to a crypt in the Franciscan Church of San Fortunato in Todi.

Poetry
Benedetti's satirical and denunciatory Laude witness to the troubled times of the warring city-states of northern Italy and the material and spiritual crisis that accompanied them. The laude are written in his native Umbrian dialect and represent the popular poetry of the region. Many hundreds of manuscripts attest to the broad popularity of his poems in many contexts - although anonymous poems are often attributed to him by the tradition. Other laude extol the spiritual value of poverty.

Some of his laude were especially in use among the so-called Laudesi and the Flagellants, who sang them in the towns, along the roads, in their confraternities and in sacred dramatical representations. With hindsight, the use of the laude may be seen as an early seed of Italian drama that came to fruition in later centuries.

The Latin poem Stabat Mater Dolorosa is generally attributed to Benedetti, although this has been disputed. It is a fine example of religious lyric in the Franciscan tradition. It was inserted into the Roman Missal and Breviary in 1727  for the Feast of the Seven Sorrows of the Blessed Virgin Mary, celebrated on the Friday before Good Friday. Following changes by Pope Pius XII, it now appears on the Feast of Our Lady's Sorrows celebrated on 15 September. Many composers have set it to music, including Josquin des Prez, Giovanni Palestrina,  Alessandro Scarlatti,  Domenico Scarlatti, Giovanni Battista Pergolesi, Gioacchino Rossini, Toivo Kuula, Antonín Dvořák and Ernő Dohnányi.

Veneration

From the time of his death, Benedetti was considered to have been a saint by his followers, both within and outside of the Franciscan Order. He is honored as Blessed within the Order.

Several attempts were made over the centuries to have the Catholic Church recognize his sanctity. In the 17th century, both the City Council and the cathedral chapter of Todi petitioned the Holy See to do so. In the 19th century, the Postulator for the causes of saints of the Order of Friars Minor collected documents for this step.

To date, however, the church has never formally approved this devotion. One possible reason for this may be the conflict between Benedetti and Pope Boniface VIII.

Legacy
Benedetti was steadfast in condemning corruption, especially through his satirical Italian poems. Benedetti would not recant his position on the requirement of ascetic poverty, believing that the mainstream church had become corrupt and that its ministers were not interested in the welfare of the poor. This criticism is echoed in the contemporary Alleluia Movement. It was a time of famine and poverty in Italy and many mystics and preachers like Gioacchino da Fiore anticipated the end of the world and the coming of Christ. They also said kings and clergy had become too attached to material goods and too interested in their personal wars rather than the welfare of the country.

Benedetti's preaching attracted many enthusiasts and Dante praised him in his Paradiso.

See also

Christian mystics
Christian poetry
Saint Francis of Assisi

References

Sources
Giudice, A. e Bruni, G. Problemi e scrittori della letteratura italiana. Torino, Paravia, 1981.
Sapegno, N. Santo Jacopone. Torino, Edizioni del Baretti, 1926, p. 30.
Novatti, F. Freschi e minii del Dugento. Milano, Cogliatti, 1925, pp. 202–204.

Bibliography
 Venuti, Lawrence. Translation Changes Everything. Routledge, 2012. Chapter 4: Translating Jacopone da Todi: archaic poetries and modern audiences.

External links
 
 
 
 Underhill, Evelyn. Jacopone da Todi, Poet and Mystic, J.M. Dent & Sons Ltd, London, 1919

1236 births
1306 deaths
People from Todi
Members of the Third Order of Saint Francis
Medieval Latin poets
Italian male poets
Italian dramatists and playwrights
Italian Friars Minor
Roman Catholic religious brothers
Franciscan mystics
13th-century venerated Christians
14th-century venerated Christians
13th-century Christian mystics
14th-century Christian mystics
Burials in Umbria
13th-century Latin writers
13th-century Italian poets